Bowery to Broadway is a 1944 American film starring Maria Montez, Jack Oakie, and Susanna Foster. Donald O'Connor and Peggy Ryan also had a small specialty act, and it was the only film they were in together where they didn't have a name or character.

The movie was made to showcase the singing talent at Universal. Montez only has a small role.

Cast 

 Maria Montez as Marina
 Jack Oakie as Michael O'Rourke
 Susanna Foster as Peggy Fleming Barrie
 Turhan Bey as Ted Barrie
 Ann Blyth as Bessie Jo Kirby
 Donald Cook as Dennis Dugan
 Louise Allbritton as Lillian Russell
 Frank McHugh as Joe Kirby
 Rosemary DeCamp as Bessie Kirby
 Leo Carrillo as P.J. Fenton
 Andy Devine as Father Kelley
 Evelyn Ankers as Bonnie Latour
 Thomas Gomez as Tom Harvey
 Richard Lane as Walter Rogers
 George Dolenz as George Henshaw
 Mantan Moreland as Alabam
 Ben Carter as No-more
 Maude Eburne as Mame Alda
 Robert Warwick as Cliff Brown
 Donald O'Connor as Specialty Number
 Peggy Ryan as Specialty Number
 unbilled players include Milton Kibbee, George Meeker, Snub Pollard and Wilbur Mack

Production
In June 1943 John Grant, who normally wrote for Abbott and Costello, was assigned to produce a film to cover the history of Broadway. It was going to be called Hip Hip Hooray and was budgeted at $1 million and shot in color. Edmund Joseph and Bart Lyton were assigned to do the script. In December 1943 it was announced Arthur Lubin would direct.

Filming started 1 May 1944. It was a rare non "exotic" role for Maria Montez.

Selected Songs
"Under the Bamboo Tree"
"Yip-I-Addy-I-Ay"
"Wait Till the Sun Shines, Nelly"
"My Song of Romance"
"Montevideo"
"He Took Her for a Sleighride in the Good Old Summertime" - with Donald O'Connor and Peggy Ryan
"There'll Always Be a Moon" - sung by Susanna Foster
"Under the Bamboo Tree" - sung by Louise Allbritton as Lillian Russell

References

External links 
 
Bowery to Broadway at TCMDB
Review of film at Variety
Review of movie at The New York Times

1944 films
Films directed by Charles Lamont
American black-and-white films
Universal Pictures films
American comedy films
1944 comedy films
Films scored by Edward Ward (composer)
1940s American films